Edakkidom is a village in the Kollam district, in the Indian state of Kerala, located about  north of Kollam city. The main attraction is Thettikkunnil Sree Mahadevi Devaswam and pulichani cave.

Geography 
Edakkidom is located among many surrounding villages:

Kottarakkara : 8.1 km
Paravur : 23.3 km
Ezhukone :3 km
Kundara : 8.4 km
 Chathannoor : 14.8 km
Odanavattom : 7.2 km
 Nedumankavu:5.8 km
 Ayoor:21.3 km
Kadaikodu (3.2 km)

Some notable nearby settlements are Kollam, Kottarakkara, Ezhukone, Odanavattom, and Punalur.

Demographics 

This village has a majority population of Hindus.

Economy
The primary occupations are in growing agricultural products, including rubber, black pepper, cashews, rice and plantain. 

Other employers include Kareepra Cooperative Bank, Edakkidom & SupplyCo Maveli Store at KSN Building, Sodiac Tiles (BK Agencies), SLS wood industries, Mother rubber manufacturers. Rajan cashews, Ambalakara cashew factory, 11 KV Substation (KSEB) AM Junction Edakkidom North, S.R. Agencies and Chaithanya Digital Studio.

Education

The primary school is Govt L.P. School Edakkidom. SNGSHS Kadaikode is an aided Sanskrit secondary school. Other schools include KNS memorial S N Central school (CBSE), St George vocational higher secondary school, Sree Sankara Sanskrit vidyapeetam (BA, MA in Sanskrit), S.S.V.U.P.S,Akshya computer education centre, vijanaodayam vayanasala and granthasala (Library )

Temples
 Edakkidom Thettikkunil Sree Maha Devi Devaswam 
 Munnur Indilayappan Temple
 Valayikkodu Karthikeyapuram Temple
 Gurunadan Mukal Temple
 Malanada Temple 
 Mannoor Thevar vishnu temple
 Thevarpoyika Mahavishnu Temple Edakkidom.
 Nalannil Sree Nagaraja Kshethram, Valayikkodu, Edakkidom

Government
Edakkidom is a part of the assembly constituency Kottarakara and Lok Sabha constituency Mavelikkara.CPI(M). The Indian National Congress is the major working political party.

References

Villages in Kollam district